Roby Luigi Zucchi (born October 9, 1951 in Genoa, Italy) was an Italian water-skier noted for slalom. He won a gold medal at the 1972 Olympics, where water skiing was an exhibition event. Later he won the slalom at the 1975 world championships. In 1995 he was inducted into the Water Skiing Hall of Fame.

References 

1951 births
Water skiers at the 1972 Summer Olympics
Living people
Olympic gold medalists for Italy
Olympic water skiers of the Italy